Hollywood Moms is a 2001 photo-book by Joyce Ostin with an introduction written by Carrie Fisher.

References

2001 non-fiction books
Photographic collections and books